Madoff is a 2016 American television miniseries written by Ben Robbins, inspired by Brian Ross' book The Madoff Chronicles, about the Madoff investment scandal. The Madoff investment scandal was a fraud scheme perpetrated by Bernie Madoff, a former stockbroker, investment advisor, and financier. He is the former non-executive chairman of the NASDAQ stock market and the admitted operator of a Ponzi scheme that is considered the largest financial fraud in U.S. history. The miniseries aired over two nights, February 3 and 4, 2016, on ABC.

Cast and characters

Main
 Richard Dreyfuss as Bernie Madoff
 Blythe Danner as Ruth Madoff
 Peter Scolari as Peter Madoff
 Frank Whaley as Harry Markopolos
 Michael Rispoli as Frank DiPascali
 Lewis Black as Gregory Perkins
 Tom Lipinski as Mark Madoff
 Danny Deferrari as Andrew Madoff
 Erin Cummings as Eleanor Squillari
 Annie Heise as Stephanie Mikesell
 Michael Bryan French as Blake North
 David Margulies as Elie Wiesel
 Liz Larsen as Sheryl Weinstein
 Jason Kravits as Frank Avellino
 Bruce Altman as Gary Flumenbaum
 David Aaron Baker as Nathan Rubenstein
 Charles Grodin as Carl J. Shapiro
 Jamie Carroll as Shana Madoff
Jack Koenig as Grant Ward

Other
 Lyne Renee as Catherine Hooper
 Ben Dreyfuss as Young Bernie Madoff
 Stephen Gevedon as Bob Jaffe
 Suzanne H. Smart as Annette Bongiorno
 Daniel Gerroll as Rene De La Villehuchet
 Scott Barry as Bernie Madoff's Driver

Episodes

Reception
The miniseries has received favorable reviews from critics. On Metacritic, it holds a 61/100 rating based on 25 reviews. On Rotten Tomatoes, it has an approval rating of 68% based on 31 reviews, with an average rating of 6/10. The site's critics consensus reads: "Madoff boasts a knockout performance from Richard Dreyfuss, whose obvious enjoyment of the role helps make up for the miniseries' surplus of polish and overall lack of perspective."

Awards and nominations

See also
 The Wizard of Lies
 Madoff: The Monster of Wall Street

References

External links
 
 

American Broadcasting Company original programming
English-language television shows
Television series by ABC Studios
Biographical films about fraudsters
Madoff investment scandal
2010s American drama television miniseries
2016 American television series debuts
2016 American television series endings
Films about con artists
Cultural depictions of Bernie Madoff
Films directed by Raymond De Felitta